Mary Catherine Gordon (born December 8, 1949) is an American writer from Queens and Valley Stream, New York. She is the McIntosh Professor of English at Barnard College.  She is best known for her novels, memoirs and literary criticism. In 2008, she was named Official State Author of New York.

Early life and education
Mary Gordon was born in Far Rockaway, New York, to Anna (Gagliano) Gordon, an Irish-Italian Catholic mother, and David Gordon, a Jewish father. Her father died in 1957 when she was young. She had identified with him and his love for writing and culture, and continued to learn his myths. When she was in her 40s, she began to learn about him, discovering that he had converted to Catholicism as a young man in 1937, before his marriage to her mother. His first name was Israel and he immigrated at the age of six with his family to Lorain, Ohio from Vilna, Lithuania. After his conversion, her father published some anti-Semitic and right-wing journalism. Gordon's search and attempt to reconcile her discoveries with the memory of her father became the basis of her memoir, The Shadow Man: A Daughter's Search for Her Father (1996).

After being widowed, her mother Anna and Mary moved to live with her maternal grandmother, who was Irish Catholic, in Valley Stream, near Queens. Her mother worked as a secretary to support them. Gordon had a very Catholic childhood. She attended Holy Name of Mary School in Valley Stream and The Mary Louis Academy for high school in Jamaica, New York.

Although her mother and her family wanted Gordon to go to a Catholic college, Gordon was awarded a scholarship to Barnard College, and she received her A.B. in 1971. She pursued graduate work, completing an M.A. at Syracuse University in 1973.

Career
Gordon lived in New Paltz, New York, for a time during the 1980s with her second husband Arthur Cash, a professor of English at the State University of New York at New Paltz. He was a Pulitzer Prize finalist (2007) and was Distinguished Professor of English Emeritus at the time of his death in 2016. They have two adult children, Anna and David.

Gordon presently resides in New York City, where she is McIntosh Professor of English at Barnard College, and in Hope Valley, Rhode Island. Novelist Galaxy Craze has said of Gordon as a teacher at Barnard, "She loves to read; she would read us passages in class and start crying, she's so moved by really good writing. And she was the only good writing teacher at Barnard, so I just kept taking her class over and over. She taught me so much."

Gordon published her first novel, Final Payments, in 1978. In 1981, she wrote the foreword to the Harvest edition of Virginia Woolf's "A Room of One's Own." 

In 1984, she was one of 97 theologians and religious persons who signed A Catholic Statement on Pluralism and Abortion, calling for religious pluralism and discussion within the Catholic Church regarding the Church's position on abortion.

Literary works

Novels
Final Payments (1978) 
The Company of Women (1981) 
 Men and Angels (1985) 
The Other Side (1989) 
Spending (1998) 
Pearl (2005) 
The Love of My Youth (2011) 
There Your Heart Lies (2017) 
Payback (2020)

Novellas and short story collections
The Rest of Life: Three Novellas (1994) 
Temporary Shelter (1987) 
The Stories of Mary Gordon (2006)  (collects Temporary Shelter and 22 previously uncollected stories)
The Liar's Wife (2014)

Non-fiction
Memoirs
The Shadow Man: A Daughter's Search For Her Father (1996) 
Seeing Through Places: Reflections on Geography and Identity (2000) 
Circling My Mother: A Memoir (2007) 
Essays
Good Boys and Dead Girls, and Other Essays (1991) 
Religion
Reading Jesus (2009) 
Biography
Joan of Arc (2000)

Prizes and awards
In 1993, Gordon received a Guggenheim Fellowship. Her other awards include a Lila Wallace–Reader's Digest Writers' Award, an O. Henry Award, and Academy Award for Literature from the American Academy of Arts and Letters. The Stories of Mary Gordon won The Story Prize in 2007. In March 2008, Governor Eliot Spitzer named Mary Gordon the official New York State Author and gave her the Edith Wharton Citation of Merit for Fiction. In 2010 she was inducted as a member of the inaugural class of the New York Writers Hall of Fame.

References

External links 
Mary Gordon Interview, transcript from the New York State Writers Institute
, an excellent unvarnished account on the Barnard website with links to recent work and reviews
Mary Gordon Interview, video with Bill Moyers for his program, 'Faith and Reason', 2006

Lopate Show with The Story Prize finalists: Rick Bass, Mary Gordon, and George Saunders (2/27/07)

1949 births
Living people
20th-century American novelists
21st-century American novelists
American academics of English literature
American literary critics
Women literary critics
American memoirists
American women novelists
American people of Irish descent
American writers of Italian descent
American people of Lithuanian-Jewish descent
Barnard College alumni
People from Queens, New York
Syracuse University alumni
American women memoirists
20th-century American women writers
21st-century American women writers
Journalists from New York City
Novelists from New York (state)
20th-century American non-fiction writers
21st-century American non-fiction writers
Catholics from New York (state)
O. Henry Award winners
American women critics
Members of the American Academy of Arts and Letters